Valle de la Serena is a Spanish municipality in the province of Badajoz, Extremadura. It has a population of 1,457 (2007) and an area of 121.4 km².

Notable people 
 Juan Donoso Cortés (6 May 1809 – 3 May 1853) was a Spanish author, conservative and Catholic political theorist, and diplomat

References

External links 
  
 Profile 

Municipalities in the Province of Badajoz